Fábio Augusto de Castro Carvalho or simply Fábio Augusto (born 6 May 1972) is a Brazilian football coach and a former player.

Honours
Flamengo
Campeonato Carioca winner: 2001
Copa dos Campeões winner: 2001

Corinthians
Campeonato Paulista winner: 1997

Vitoria-BA
Campeonato Baiano winner: 1999, 2000

Kalmar FF
Svenska Cupen winner: 2007

References

1972 births
Sportspeople from Niterói
Living people
Brazilian footballers
CR Flamengo footballers
Guarani FC players
Clube Atlético Mineiro players
Sport Club Corinthians Paulista players
Botafogo de Futebol e Regatas players
Esporte Clube Vitória players
Figueirense FC players
FC Chernomorets Novorossiysk players
Russian Premier League players
Brazilian expatriate footballers
Expatriate footballers in Russia
Allsvenskan players
Kalmar FF players
Expatriate footballers in Sweden
America Football Club (RJ) players
Audax Rio de Janeiro Esporte Clube players
Clube Atlético Juventus players
Uberaba Sport Club players
Desportiva Ferroviária players
Paulínia Futebol Clube players
River Atlético Clube players
Brazilian football managers
Association football midfielders